G-BBDG (manufacturer's serial number 202, known as "Delta Golf") was the British development Concorde built for evaluation testing. Along with the French Concorde F-WTSB, the aircraft was used to enable sufficient testing to allow for the Concorde fleet to receive certification. She was stored at Filton airfield from the mid-1980s until 2003, when she was transported by road to the Brooklands Museum in Weybridge, Surrey.

History
G-BBDG first flew on the 13 February 1974, having been registered on 7 August 1973. Her main uses were finalising the Concorde design before the other aircraft entered passenger service and certification prior to Concorde entering passenger service.

There were some differences between this aircraft and the final production aircraft, such as a thinner fuselage skin. The aircraft was painted in British Airways livery throughout her testing period. The aircraft flew a total of 1282 hrs 9 mins; her final flight was on the 24 December 1981.

After the final flight, she was stored at Filton in a state of semi-airworthiness throughout 1982, where she could be returned to flight in two weeks if required. However this was never required and the aircraft was eventually bought by British Airways as part of a Concorde support buy-out in 1984.

The aircraft never entered service with British Airways; instead she was used as a major source of spare parts, allowing the airline to operate a fleet of seven aircraft.  A hangar was constructed for her at Filton airfield in the late 1980s; her tail was removed prior to her being put in the hangar.

In 1995, Concorde G-BOAF had her nose damaged in a handling accident at Heathrow Airport. British Airways swapped this nose with the nose of the Filton Concorde. As well as her nose and tail, other parts were taken, including her engines, landing gear and the majority of the components from the hydraulic system. The original nose was later repaired at Brooklands and returned to G-BBDG.

The aircraft was considered for scrapping many times, but was always found to be useful. In 2001, she was used to test reinforced cockpit doors required for all aircraft after the 11 September 2001 terrorist attacks.

When British Airways and Air France retired their fleets in 2003, Brooklands Museum at Weybridge in Surrey accepted the aircraft as a museum exhibit. It was dismantled as fully as possible and the rest was cut up into five major sections and transported by road to Brooklands Museum. The task of structurally disassembling and reassembling the aircraft was carried out by Air Salvage International (ASI). She was then restored by a team of over 100 volunteers from the museum, assisted by students from the University of Surrey.

The Concorde Experience was opened at the museum in July 2006 by Prince Michael of Kent; it allows visitors to enter the aircraft and experience a virtual flight at speeds up to Mach 2.

See also
 Concorde aircraft histories

References

External links

 Concorde at Brooklands

Concorde
Individual aircraft